Charissa glaucinaria is a moth of the family Geometridae first described by Jacob Hübner in 1799. It is found in the mountains of central and southern Europe. In the east, it ranges to Turkey, Ukraine and Georgia. In the Alps it is found at altitudes of over 2,000 meters.

The wingspan is 30–36 mm. There are up to three generations per year with adults on wing from May to June, July to September and up to November.

The larvae feed on various plants, including Sedum album, Silene and Campanula species.

Subspecies
 Charissa glaucinaria glaucinaria
 Charissa glaucinaria fischeri Wehrli 1934
 Charissa glaucinaria intermediaria Turati, 1919
 Charissa glaucinaria juravolans Wehrli, 1924
 Charissa glaucinaria peruni Varga, 1975
 Charissa glaucinaria salvatorensis Schwingenschuss, 1942

External links

 Lepiforum e.V.
 Schmetterlinge-Deutschlands.de

Gnophini
Moths of Europe
Moths of Asia
Taxa named by Jacob Hübner